Namouna may refer to
Alfred de Musset's 1831 collections of poem Namouna
A 1882 ballet with music by Lalo and choreography by Petipa.
James Gordon Bennett, Jr.'s 1882 845-ton steamyacht Namouna
Alexei Ratmansky's 2010 ballet